Gerardo César Yecerotte Soruco (born August 28, 1985 in Orán, Salta Province) is an Argentine-bolivian football striker that currently plays for Club Bolivar in the Israeli Premier League. He was a naturalized Bolivian because his mother was born in Bolivia. He also has participated in FIFA World Cup qualifiers for 2010.

Club career
Yecerotte began his career with Independiente de Hipólito Yrigoyen, a club of his natal province, with the club, Yecerotte played the Torneo Argentino C during 2004 and 2005.

In 2006, he went to test to Bolivia. After of training with La Paz and not be hired, the coach Félix Berdera, led to Yecerotte to Real Potosí, and he made his debut in the Primera División Boliviana. In 2007, he was proclaimed champion with his club of Torneo Apertura Boliviano 2007, being this his first professional title in his career.

International career
In 2009, he was naturalized bolivian due to his mother was born in Bolivia and he made his debut with the Bolivia national football team for the World Cup qualifiers.

Due to his naturalization, Yecerotte made his debut against Venezuela national football team on 6 June 2009. He scored his first goal for the national team against Ecuador national football team, in a 3-1 home loss in Estadio Hernando Siles.

International goals

References

External links
 Gerardo Yecerotte at Football Lineups
 Ole Ole Profile
 
 

Bolivia international footballers
Bolivian footballers
Club Real Potosí players
Association football forwards
Expatriate footballers in Bolivia
Argentine expatriate sportspeople in Bolivia
Sportspeople from Salta Province
1985 births
Living people